Luciano da Rocha Neves (born 5 May 1993), simply known as Luciano, is a Brazilian professional footballer who plays as a forward for São Paulo FC.

Club career
Luciano was born in Anápolis, Goiás, and joined Atlético Goianiense's youth setup from hometown club Anápolis. He made his debut for the former on 8 March 2012, coming on as a second-half substitute for William in a 1–0 away win against Gurupi, for the year's Copa do Brasil.

Luciano made his Série A debut on 13 October 2012, coming from the bench and scoring the last in a 3–1 home win against Internacional. He contributed with five league appearances during the campaign, suffering team relegation.

In 2013 Luciano moved to Avaí in the Série B. He again made his debut with a goal, netting his team's only in a 1–3 loss at Chapecoense.

On 13 February 2014, Luciano signed a three-year contract with Corinthians in the top level. He made his debut for the club nine days later, replacing Romarinho in a 3–2 Campeonato Paulista home win against Rio Claro.

Luciano subsequently scored two braces for Timão, in a 3–0 home win against Comercial and in a 4–0 away routing of Linense. On 22 August 2014 he scored a hat-trick in a 5–2 home success over Goiás.

On 19 August 2015, in a match against Santos for the national cup, Luciano suffered a serious knee injury. He was sidelined for seven months, returning to action in February of the following year.

On 24 August 2016, Luciano was loaned to La Liga side CD Leganés for one year, with a buyout clause.

Panathinaikos, Fluminense and Grêmio
On 12 July 2017, Corinthians striker is finally expected in Athens, in order to finalize the last details of deal with Greek Superleague club Panathinaikos. On 17 July 2017 Luciano was officially loaned until the end of the year, as he is expected to sign a contract until June 2020 with the "greens" on 1 January 2018. On 20 September 2017, Luciano suffered a serious cruciate rupture injury during Greek Cup's clash against AEL in Leoforos. It is expected to return in action in March 2018.

In the end of 2018 he goes to Fluminense.

In 2019, he goes to Grêmio.

São Paulo

On 18th August 2020, Luciano signed until December of 2022 with São Paulo FC. He came to Tricolor after Éverton signed with Grêmio, and going to Luciano's opposite side.

International career
Luciano was called for the Brazil U23 team representing the country at the 2015 Pan American Games in Toronto, Ontario, Canada. He was the tournament's top goalscorer with five goals in only four matches, and won a Bronze medal.

Career statistics

Honours
Corinthians
Campeonato Brasileiro Série A: 2015

São Paulo
Campeonato Paulista: 2021

References

External links

1993 births
Living people
People from Anápolis
Brazilian footballers
Association football forwards
Campeonato Brasileiro Série A players
Campeonato Brasileiro Série B players
Avaí FC players
Atlético Clube Goianiense players
La Liga players
Sport Club Corinthians Paulista players
CD Leganés players
São Paulo FC players
Footballers at the 2015 Pan American Games
Pan American Games bronze medalists for Brazil
Brazil youth international footballers
Brazilian expatriate footballers
Brazilian expatriate sportspeople in Spain
Expatriate footballers in Spain
Pan American Games medalists in football
Super League Greece players
Medalists at the 2015 Pan American Games
Sportspeople from Goiás